Gilbert Robinson (born  – death unknown) was a professional rugby league footballer who played in the 1920s and 1930s.

Playing career

International honours
Gilbert Robinson was selected for Great Britain while at Wakefield Trinity for the 1932 Great Britain Lions tour of Australia and New Zealand.

County Cup Final appearances
Gilbert Robinson played  in Wakefield Trinity's 0-8 defeat by Leeds in the 1932 Yorkshire County Cup Final during the 1932–33 season at Fartown Ground, Huddersfield on Saturday 19 November 1932

Club career
Gilbert Robinson made his début for Wakefield Trinity during November 1929, and he played his last match for Wakefield Trinity during August 1933, he appears to have scored no drop-goals (or field-goals as they are currently known in Australasia), but prior to the 1974–75 season all goals, whether; conversions, penalties, or drop-goals, scored 2-points, consequently prior to this date drop-goals were often not explicitly documented, therefore '0' drop-goals may indicate drop-goals not recorded, rather than no drop-goals scored. In addition, prior to the 1949–50 season, the archaic field-goal was also still a valid means of scoring points.

References

External links
!Great Britain Statistics at englandrl.co.uk (statistics currently missing due to not having appeared for both Great Britain, and England)
Search for "Robinson" at rugbyleagueproject.org

1900s births
Castleford Tigers players
English rugby league players
Great Britain national rugby league team players
Place of birth missing
Place of death missing
Rugby league centres
Rugby league fullbacks
Wakefield Trinity players
Year of death missing